Dedmon is a surname. Notable people with the surname include:

DeVonte Dedmon
Dewayne Dedmon (born 1989), American basketball player
Donald Dedmon (1931–1998), American university president
Jeff Dedmon (born 1960), American baseball player
Vanessa Jean Dedmon (born 1987), German singer